Istvan Arkossy (born 1943) is a Hungarian painter and graphic artist.  He is a member of the Association of Hungarian Creative Artists, the Federation of Hungarian Fine and Applied Arts Societies and the Association of Hungarian Graphic Artists.

Biography
Árkossy was born in Kolozsvár (present-day Cluj-Napoca, Romania), in what was at the time part of Hungary (due to the Second Vienna Award); he graduated from the University of Fine Arts there in 1966.  He currently resides in Budapest.

Individual exhibitions 
 1972, 1976, 1982 Klausenburg
 1984 Young Artists Club Budapest
 1988 Gutenberg Gallery Budapest
 1988 Medgyessy Saloon Debrecen
 1989 Dürer Saloon Budapest
 1989 Art Exhibition Center Stuttgart Germany
 1989 Geretsried Germany
 1989 Frankfurt am Main Germany
 1992 Asemwald Stuttgart Germany
 1993 Csók Gallery Budapest
 2003 Korunk Gallery Klausenburg
 2004 Vármegye Gallery Budapest

Foreign collective exhibitions 
 1986 Titograd Yugoslavia
 1978 Joan Miró International Drawing Contest Barcelona Spain
 1979 Small Graphic Biennale Łódź Poland
 1980 Ex Libris Exhibition Linz Austria
 1981 Sint Niklaas Belgium
 1982 Small Graphic Exhibition Athens Greece
 1983 Collective Migrant Exhibition USA
 1983 Graphic Biennale Ljubljana Yugoslavia
 1986 Graphic Exhibition New York City USA
 1988 Tampere Finland
 1988 Antwerp Belgium
 1990 Ex Libris Biennale Malbork Poland
 1990 Mönchengladbach Germany
 1991 Graphic Biennale Łódź Poland
 1992 Exhibition of Artists of Budapest Munich Germany
 1993 Glinde Germany.

Exhibitions in Hungary 
 1987, 1989, 1991, 2000 National Graphic Biennale Miskolc
 1988, 1990, 1992, 1998, 2000, 2002 National Drawing Biennale Salgótarján
 1991 Árkád Gallery Budapest
 1992, 2002, 2004 National Small Graphic Biennale Újpest Budapest
 1992 Exhibition of Graphic Studios Csók Gallery Budapest
 1999 XXXI.-, 2003 XXXIII. – Alföld Art Exhibition Békéscsaba
 2000 Art Kortárs Gallery and Foundation of Hungarian Graphics: Selected small graphics Budapest
 2000, 2002 National Pastel Biennale Esztergom
 2001 Foundation of National Culture hall Budapest
 2002 Ernst Museum Budapest.

References

External links
 Personal website

Hungarian painters
1943 births
Living people
Artists from Cluj-Napoca